A number of steamships were named Montrose, including -

, a Canadian ocean liner in service 1897–1914
, a Canadian ocean liner in service 1922–39

Ship names